Bancroft's School is a co-educational private day school located in Woodford Green, London Borough of Redbridge. The school currently has around 1,000 pupils aged between 7 and 18, around 200 of whom are pupils of the Preparatory School and 800 of whom are pupils of the Senior School.

The school's alumni – or "Old Bancroftians" – include naturalists, poets, academics, politicians, authors, sportsmen, actors, and military figures. These include two recipients of the Victoria Cross – Britain's highest military award for gallantry. They are Robert "Eddie" Cruickshank and Augustus Charles Newman.

In recent years these have included David Pannick, Alan Davies, Hari Kunzru, Russell Lissack, YolanDa Brown and Tia Kofi

History

The school was founded in 1737, following the 1728 death of Francis Bancroft, who bequeathed a sizeable sum of money to the Drapers' Company, which continues to act as trustee for the school. Bancroft's began in the Mile End Road in London's East End as a small charitable day school for boys, with an attached almshouse.

The foundation was originally known as Bancroft's Hospital and until the late 19th century also acted as home for almsmen who had been freemen of the Company of Drapers. In 1884 the almshouse was abolished and the school moved to a new site at Woodford Green and the original buildings were demolished; the site is now occupied by Queen Mary, University of London.

The current school location in Woodford Green occupies four and a half acres, and the main buildings were designed by Arthur Blomfield, who was also responsible for Selwyn College in Cambridge. Originally there were just a hundred pupils, including sixty boarders. The numbers grew steadily during the twentieth century until there were nearly one thousand on the roll. The buildings were also extended, with the original Science Block (1910) then further extended (1969/70 and officially opened by Sir Solly Zuckerman), the Great Hall (1937), the Adams Building (Music Block) (1964), a new Gymnasium Block (1975), the Preparatory School (1990), the Courtyard Building (2006), new Sports Block (2007), and Preparatory School Extension (2009).

Following the Education Act 1944, Bancroft's became a direct grant grammar school. However, the removal of this status in the 1970s prompted the governors to decide on three courses of action: to discontinue boarding, to admit girls for the first time and become fully independent. Some years later the decision was also taken to build a new preparatory school.  These were all completed by 1990; the school now takes half its pupils from age 7, and half the pupils are now girls. In 1997, the government abolished the Assisted Places Scheme, which had helped children from poor families to attend the school; the governors replaced these by Francis Bancroft Scholarships, which were supported by the Drapers' Company and by the residue of Francis Bancroft's original will. These awards are means-tested, and can be worth the entire school fee.

In 2004, a new major building programme began. The Courtyard Building, consisting of new kitchens, a communal atrium, staff offices, further teaching rooms and a new Sixth Form Centre, was opened by Chris Woodhead in February 2006, and a new large Sports Hall was completed at the beginning of the Summer Term 2007. In 2009, a conversion of the old gymnasium into a modern Drama Centre was finished with students enjoying the new facilities available. A large new building for the preparatory school and a second floor in the historic library for additional computer usage was completed in 2010. In 2011, an extension to the recently built 6th form block comprising a number of new facilities including a separate 6th form library was completed. The school also continues to invest heavily in its IT infrastructure with the roll-out of new hardware and software systems in 2007.

Mary Ireland became headmistress in January 2008, succeeding Peter Scott. She last worked at Christ's Hospital, where she was deputy head to Peter Southern, himself a previous headmaster at Bancroft's. It was announced in October 2015 that Mary Ireland would be succeeded by Simon Marshall as Head following the 2015–2016 academic year.

The school team, led by English teacher Kevin Gallagher, won the Kids' Lit Quiz in 2009 at the world final in South Africa.

Year groups
Preparatory School

Senior School

Preparatory School

The Preparatory School was founded in 1990 after the senior school had converted from a direct grant grammar to an independent school. Unlike most traditional preparatory schools, the final year is Year 6 (age 11) and not Year 8 (age 13).

Curriculum

For the first two years, students study the following subjects: English, Maths, Spanish, German, Combined Science, Drama, Religious Studies, Geography, PSHE, History, PE, Games, Music, Technology and Art.

In the Removes year (Year 8), students choose two languages to study out of French, German, Spanish, and Russian, and also study Latin.

In the Lower Fourth year (Year 9) students choose three subjects from Latin, Classics, Ancient Greek, Russian, French, Spanish and German and two creative subjects from Art, Music, Design Technology, Drama and Computer Science.

At GCSE level, all pupils take the following core subjects: English Language, English Literature, Mathematics, Physics, Chemistry, and Biology. Four additional subjects are chosen from the following, one of which must be a language: Art, DT, Music, Spanish, German, French, Russian, Latin, Classical Civilisation, Classical Greek, Religious Studies, Physical Education, Drama, Computer Science, Geography, and History.

The school follows the IGCSE syllabi in Mathematics and English. Around a third of pupils take Mathematics a year early, going on to do an FSMQ in Additional Mathematics in the Fifth Form.

A-Level students choose three, four, or sometimes five of the subjects offered by the school: Art, Biology, Business Studies, Chemistry, Classical Civilisation, Classical Greek, Computer Science, Design Technology, Drama, Economics, Electronics, English Literature, French, Geography, German, History, Latin, Mathematics, Further Mathematics, Music, Politics, Physics, Religious Studies, Russian and Spanish.

Grading system

Pre-GCSE students (Thirds, Removes and Lower-Fourths [up to the last half-term of the year]) are given grades with A to D measuring effort (With A representing the highest level of effort given) and 6 to 1 measuring achievement (With 6 representing the highest level of achievement). GCSE students receive a number grade for achievement ranging from 1 to 9, 9 being a high A*, 8 being an A*, 7 being an A/A*, 6 being an A, and so on, along with three separate letter grades, which are based on a student's attitude, classwork and homework. Students who achieve 8A* or more (usually around 2% of a cohort), will be awarded an honorary scholarship.  In the sixth form years, grading is carried out using the same letter and number grades as those used for GCSE students, but numeric grades correspond to expected AS or A Level results instead.

Heads

Notable alumni

The Old Bancroftians Association
The Old Bancroftians Association (OBA) was founded in 1892 when the Old Bancroftians' Football Club was formed, although there were already a few unofficial groups which had been around since the 1860s. The first meeting was held in 1896 at the Haunch of Venison in Fleet Street. However, a constitution was not agreed until 1909, when the first President, H.C Playne (who was also the school's Head Master), was appointed. The idea of the association was to keep young and old members together.

The association grew rapidly over the years, to a size of 3175 members in 2005, when membership for life was introduced for all Bancroftians.

The association provides a range of services for former members of the school, including the organisation of reunions and sports activities, including cricket, rugby golf, and football.

References

External links
Official website
Bancroft's School's Virtual Learning Environment
Profile on the ISC website
Old Bancroftians website
Bancroftian Lodge

1737 establishments in England
Educational institutions established in 1737
Arthur Blomfield buildings
Private co-educational schools in London
Private schools in the London Borough of Redbridge
Kids' Lit Quiz winners
Member schools of the Headmasters' and Headmistresses' Conference